GoComics is a website launched in 2005 by the digital entertainment provider Uclick. It was originally created as a distribution portal for comic strips on mobile phones, but in 2006, the site was redesigned and expanded to include online strips and cartoons. GoComics publishes editorial cartoons, mobile content, and daily comics. It is currently owned by Andrews McMeel Universal. 

Comics are arranged into feature pages, which display the latest comic strip with a 30-day archive, or the entire archive for paying members. Other features such as descriptions of strip characters, biographical information about cartoonists and links to other recommended feature pages are often included.

As of 2016, GoComics had more than 44,000 subscribers worldwide. In addition to the contents of the page on the site, users can have strips emailed to them daily for a fee, . Users can also comment on, collect, tag, and share their favorite comics.

GoComics strips and panels
The following are some, but not all, of the comic strips and panels GoComics features:

 The Academia Waltz
 Adam@Home
 Aggressive Shizuka
 Agnes
 Andertoons
 The Angry Birds Movie
 Animal Crackers
 Andy Capp
 Annie
 Arctic Circle
 The Argyle Sweater
 Art by Moga
 Ask a Cat
 Ask Shagg
 B.C.
 Back in the Day
 Bad Reporter
 Baldo
 Ballard Street
 Banana Triangle 
 Barkeater Lake
 Basic Instructions
 Big Nate
 Bleeker: The Rechargeable Dog
 Bloom County
 Bob the Squirrel
 The Boondocks
 Bozo
 The Buckets
 Brenda Starr
 Brevity
 Brewster Rockit: Space Guy!
 Broom Hilda
 Buckles
 Calvin and Hobbes
 Candorville
 The Cardinal
 Cathy
 Cat's Cafe
 C'est la Vie
 Citizen Dog
 The City by Derf
 Cleats
 Compu-toon
 Close to Home
 Cornered
 Crabgrass
 Cul de Sac
 Daddy's Home
 Dark Side of the Horse
 Dick Tracy
 Dilbert (removed February 2023)
 The Dinette Set
 Dog Eat Doug
 Doonesbury
 Drive
 The Duplex
 The Flying McCoys
 For Better or For Worse
 Four Eyes
 Fowl Language
 FoxTrot
 Frank and Ernest
 Frankie Comics
 Frazz
 Fred Basset
 Frog Applause
 The Fusco Brothers
 Garfield
 Garfield Classics
 Gaturro
 Gasoline Alley
 Get a Life
 Get Fuzzy
 Gil Thorp
 Ginger Meggs
 Ham Shears
 Heart of the City
 Heathcliff
 Hubris!
 Incidental Comics
 Ink Pen
 InSecurity
 Invisible Bread
 Jane's World
 Jim's Journal
 Joe and Monkey
 La Cucaracha
 Lay Lines
 Liberty Meadows
 Lil Miesters
 Liō
 Luann
 Maintaining
 Mannequin on the Moon
 Marmaduke
 The Meaning of Lila
 Momma
 Mother Goose and Grimm
 Mutt and Jeff
 New Adventures of Queen Victoria
 Non Sequitur
 The Norm
 Nancy
 Nancy Classics
 Oh, Brother!
 Ollie and Quentin
 One Big Happy
 Opus
 Overboard
 Ozy and Millie
 Peanuts
 Peanuts Begins
 Pearls Before Swine
 Phoebe and Her Unicorn
 Pibgorn
 Pickles
 Pluggers
 Pooch Cafe
 Poorly Drawn Lines
 Poptropica (redirects to game)
 PreTeena
 Prickly City
 Real Life Adventures
 Red and Rover
 Red Meat
 Ripley's Believe It or Not
 Sarah's Scribbles
 Savage Chickens
 Sherman's Lagoon
 Shoe
 Shoecabbage
 Shortcuts
 Skin Horse
 Slowpoke
 Speed Bump
 Spot the Frog
 Starslip
 Stone Soup
 Tank McNamara
 Thatababy
 The Wandering Melon
 Tiny Sepuku
 Tom the Dancing Bug
 Up and Out
 U.S. Acres (until 2020)
 Wallace the Brave
 Watch Your Head
 Wee Pals
 Winnie the Pooh
 Wizard of Id
 Working Daze
 Wrong Hands
 Wumo
 Yenny
 Ziggy

Editorial cartoonists

 Lalo Alcaraz
 Nick Anderson
 Chuck Asay
 Tony Auth
 Bruce Beattie
 Clay Bennett
 Lisa Benson
 Steve Benson
 Chip Bok
 Jim Borgman
 Steve Breen
 Chris Britt
 Stuart Carlson
 Ken Catalino
 Paul Conrad
 Jeff Danziger
 Matt Davies
 John Deering
 Bob Gorrell
 John Graziano
 Alex Hallatt
 Walt Handelsman
 David Horsey
 Clay Jones
 Kevin Kallaugher
 Steve Kelley
 Dick Locher
 Chan Lowe
 Mike Luckovich
 Gary Markstein
 Glenn McCoy
 Jim Morin
 Mike Shiell
 Jack Ohman
 Pat Oliphant
 Joel Pett
 Dwane Powell
 Ted Rall
 Michael Ramirez
 Marshall Ramsey
 Steve Sack
 Ben Sargent
 Drew Sheneman
 John Sherffius
 Scott Stantis
 Wayne Stayskal
 Dana Summers
 Paul Szep
 Mike Thompson
 Tom Toles
 Gary Varvel
 Kerry Waghorn
 Dan Wasserman
 Signe Wilkinson
 Don Wright
 Rob Rogers
 Ann Telnaes

References

External links
 

 
Internet properties established in 2005
Websites about comics
Comic strip syndicates